Eurybacteria is a taxon created by Cavalier-Smith, which includes several groups of Gram-negative bacteria. In this model, it is the ancestor of gram positive bacteria. Their endospores are characterized by producing and presenting external flagella or mobility by bacterial displacement.

Members
Specifically, it includes:

 Fusobacteria. For example, Leptotrichia and Fusobacterium
 Togobacteria. For example, Thermotoga.

In the standard classification, Selenobacteria are usually included in the phylum Bacillota, whereas fusobacteria and togobacteria are classified as their own groups.

Relationships
The following graph shows Cavalier-Smith's version of the tree of life, indicating the status of eurybacteria.

References 

Bacteria by classification
Bacteriology